Tom Farrage (born July 17, 1958, in Blythe, California)
is a metal fabricator, craftsman and art collector who frequently collaborates with architects, artists, inventors, engineers, and filmmakers. Educated at the Southern California Institute of Architecture(1987), he works in steel, stainless steel, bronze, copper, aluminum; mixed media wood, plastic and glass. He has a long association with what has been called the “L.A. Avant Garde” award-winning architects Thom Mayne, Eric Owen Moss, Michael Rotondi, Craig Hodgetts, Frank Israel (b. 1945, d. 1996) and Frank Gehry. He is the owner of Farrage & Company, co-owner of Nakao::Farrage Architects in Culver City, California, and is also the trustee of the Nathan H. Shapira Archives, in Southern California.

Tom Farrage and Company 
Founded in 1987, the first shop opened across the street from SCI-Arc, on the corner of Berkeley and Nebraska Street, in Santa Monica. Thom Mayne was one of his first clients, arriving with plans for the Thom Mayne's 6th Street residence and a spaceship for his son Cooper. Wolf Prix of Coop Himmelb(l)au, Ray Kappe, Robert Graham, Rem Koolhaas, Gary Paige, Daly – Genik, Susan Narduli, Charles and Elizabeth Lee, and artist Lee Jaffe soon followed. The work has often been experimental, largely a collaboration with architects trying to break away from the limits of straight walls and flat surfaces characteristic of late Modernism.

Tom Farrage's Philosophy 
Tom Farrage continues designing and building on the micro and macro scales. He explained, “For me, metal work, which is my trade, and architecture, which is my avocation, are inseparable. Making small objects of steel bronze, stainless steel, aluminum, copper, titanium, wood, concrete and glass is a rehearsal in the small for architecture in the large.” He further expressed the collaborative process of working with other architects is a special opportunity bound to yield results that are sometimes expected, sometimes surprising. Tom prefers to begin work at the embryonic stage of the design process, augmenting his own training and development. In his design realm, he thrives to bridge the gap between a sketch and spaces people inhabit.

Selected projects 

Thom Mayne, SHR Perceptual Management, Scottsdale, Arizona
Eric Owen Moss, If Not Now, When?, SCI-Arc Gallery
Patrick Tighe, Moving Picture Company, Santa Monica, CA
Richard Meier, Gil Friesen Residence, Los Angeles
Nolan Bushnell, U-Wink Restaurants
Nathan Mabry, Cherry and Martin Gallery
Rem Koolhaas, Prada, Rodeo Dr.

Other collaborations 
Dean Factor, Smashbox Studios
Stavros Merjos, H S I Productions
Circa 2-k Entertainment
St. John Maron Catholic Church
PVUSD, Appleby Elementary School

Selected bibliography 
Michael Webb, Brave New Homes, Rizzoli 2003.
International Architecture Yearbook no.6, Images Publishing.

Awards 
Best of Los Angeles, 2007

Articles 
If Not Now, When? by Eric Owen Moss Architects
Architectural Record
Volume 5
Los Angeles, August 2007.
Frame, March/April 2003.
Monument, 2002.
LA Weekly, Feb. 2002
LA Architects, November/December 2001.
LA Architects, January/February 2000.
Quaderni issue 19, 1997
Domus No. 737, 1992

References

External links 
 Official Website
Architectural Record

1958 births
Living people
People from Blythe, California